Salim Al-Mubarak Al-Sabah (born 1864 – 23 February 1921) was the ninth ruler of the Sheikhdom of Kuwait.

He was the second son of Mubarak I and is the ancestor of the Al-Salim branch of the Al-Sabah family. He ruled from 5 February 1917 to 23 February 1921. He succeeded his brother Jabir II upon his death. Prior to his ascension, Salim served as the governor of Kuwait City from 1915 to 1917 and was the lead cavalry and infantry commander of defense and security forces during the 1920 Battle of Jahra. Following his death in February 1921 Ahmad Al-Jaber Al-Sabah became the ruler.

References

20th-century rulers in Asia
1864 births
1921 deaths
House of Al-Sabah
Honorary Companions of the Order of the Star of India
Rulers of Kuwait